The Limentra di Sambuca (also: Limentra occidentale) is a mountain river in Italy, a right tributary of the Reno. The waters are also used for the aqueduct serving Pistoia.

Rivers of Italy
Rivers of Tuscany
Rivers of Emilia-Romagna
Rivers of the Province of Pistoia
Rivers of the Province of Bologna